Time is an instrumental album released by Steve Howe in 2011.

Track listings

Personnel

Steve Howe - guitars
Paul K. Joyce - keyboards and arrangements
Virgil Howe - keyboards on Kindred Spirits
Classical Ensemble (uncredited musicians)

References

Steve Howe (musician) albums
2011 albums